Pierre Chaignon, S.J. (1791–1883) was a French Jesuit priest and spiritual writer.

Life
Pierre Chaignon was born in Saint-Pierre-la-Cour, Mayenne, France, on 8 October 1791.

He was professed into the Society of Jesus on 14 August 1819 at the age of 27, and spent his life as a priest in the spiritual direction of other priests, giving an estimated three hundred retreats to French clergy over the course of thirty years. He wrote a book of spiritual meditations for priests entitled Méditationes sacerdotales and established a Union of Prayer for Deceased Priests which was canonically erected into a confraternity in 1861.

He died at Angers on 20 September 1883.

Bibliography
Méditationes Sacerdotales ( or Meditations for the Use of the Secular Clergy)
Le Salut Facilité aux Pécheurs par la Dévotion au Très Saint et Immaculé Coeur de Marie
Les Six Dimanches de St. Louis de Gonzague
Le Prêtre è l'Autel ( or The Sacrifice of the Mass Worthily Celebrated)
Paix de l'Ame

References

External links
A 1907 English translation of Meditations for the Use of the Secular Clergy by L. de Goesbriand on Google Books
An 1897 English translation of The Sacrifice of the Mass Worthily Celebrated by L. de Goesbriand on Google Books

1791 births
1883 deaths
People from Mayenne
19th-century French Jesuits
French spiritual writers
French male non-fiction writers